Lopha cristagalli, the cockscomb oyster, is a species of marine bivalve molluscs in the family Ostreidae.

Description
 
The cockscomb oyster has a shell reaching a maximum diameter of about 20.5 cm, commonly 10 cm. It has a variable coloration, dark to light purple, and it is a thick, strongly ribbed, and slightly inequivalve shell.  The shell inside is porcelaneous, usually purplish-brown or whitish in colour. The margins of  the valves have a characteristic zig-zag pattern. The surfaces of both valves have many small, low, and rounded protuberances. These molluscs are stationary epifaunal suspension feeders, as they feed filtering sea water to extract the nutrients.

Distribution and habitat
This species is widespread in the Indo-West Pacific, from East Africa, including Madagascar, Mauritius, the Red Sea, Seychelles, and the Persian Gulf, to Micronesia; north to Japan and south to Papua New Guinea and Indonesia. It lives on coral reefs in shallow subtidal waters at depths of 5 to 30 m.

References
 Biolib
 WoRMS
 Ftp.fao
 Animal Diversity

Ostreidae
Molluscs described in 1758
Taxa named by Carl Linnaeus